The Revolutionary People's Party (DEV-PARTİ) is a Marxist anti-imperialist political party in Turkey. The DEV-PARTİ was founded on 28 September 2011 and led by Celal Özcan. Party dissolved on 20 July 2017.

See also
  Revolutionary People's Party (Turkey, illegal)

References 

2011 establishments in Turkey
Anti-imperialist organizations
Left-wing politics in Turkey
Marxist parties
Political parties established in 2011
Political parties in Turkey
Socialist parties in Turkey